The Portland Basin is a roughly  topographic and structural depression in the central Puget-Willamette Lowland. The Portland Basin is
Most of the basin-fill material was carried in from the east by the Columbia River.

References

Structural basins of the United States
Geology of Oregon
Geology of Washington (state)